Cyrus the Great was the founder of the Achaemenid Empire and king of Persia from 559-530 BC.  He is venerated in the Hebrew Bible as Cyrus the Messiah for conquering Babylon and liberating the Jews from captivity. 

According to the Bible, Cyrus the Great, king of the Achaemenid Empire, was the monarch who ended the Babylonian captivity. In the first year of his reign he was prompted by God to decree that the Temple in Jerusalem should be rebuilt and that Jews who wished to could return to their homeland for this purpose. Moreover, he showed his interest in the project by sending back with them the sacred vessels which had been taken from the First Temple and a considerable sum of money with which to buy building materials. The existence of the decree has been questioned by modern scholars.

Cyrus in Babylon and the Jewish connection

Cyrus the Great is unconditionally praised in the Jewish sources. It is likely that, after the Persian conquest of Babylon, Cyrus had commenced his relationship with the Jewish leaders in exile, and the Book of Isaiah says that he was anointed by God.

The Hebrew Bible states that Cyrus issued the decree of liberation to the Jews. Cyrus's edict for the rebuilding of the Temple in Jerusalem marked a great epoch in the history of the Jewish people. According to  "the enemies of Judah and Benjamin" asked to help build the temple, and when this was denied hired counselors to frustrate the people of Judah from completing the rebuilding throughout the reign of Cyrus, Xerxes ('Ahasuerus'), and Artaxerxes, until the reign of Darius II. The work recommenced under the exhortations of the prophets, and when the authorities asked the Jews what right they had to build a temple, they referred to the decree of Cyrus. Darius II, who was then reigning, caused a search for this alleged decree to be made, and it was found in the archives at Ecbatana, whereupon Darius reaffirmed the decree and the work proceeded to its triumphant close.

A chronicle drawn up just after the conquest of Babylonia by Cyrus gives the history of the reign of Nabonidus ('Nabuna'id'), the last king of Babylon, and of the fall of the Babylonian empire.  In 538 BC, there was a revolt in Southern Babylonia, while the army of Cyrus entered the country from the north. In June the Babylonian army was completely defeated at Opis, and immediately afterwards Sippara opened its gates to the conqueror. Gobryas (Ugbaru), the governor of Media, was then sent to Babylon, which surrendered "without fighting," and the daily services in the temples continued without a break. In October, Cyrus himself arrived, and proclaimed a general amnesty, which was communicated by Gobryas to "all the province of Babylon," of which he had been made governor. Meanwhile, Nabonidus, who had concealed himself, was captured, but treated honourably; and when his wife died, Cambyses II, the son of Cyrus, conducted the funeral. Cyrus now assumed the title of "king of Babylon," claimed to be the descendant of the ancient kings, and made rich offerings to the temples. At the same time he allowed the foreign populations who had been deported to Babylonia to return to their old homes, carrying with them the images of their gods. Among these populations were the Jews, who, as they had no images, took with them the sacred vessels of the temple.

Speculation abounds as to the reasoning for Cyrus' release of the Jews from Babylon. One argument is that Cyrus was a follower of Zoroaster, the monotheistic prophet: Zoroastrianism played a dominant religious role in Persia throughout its history until the Islamic conquest. As such, he would have felt a kindred spirit with the monotheistic Jews. Another possibility is the magnanimous respect he is ascribed to have evinced for the diverse beliefs and customs of the peoples within his extended kingdom. As one example, upon the conquest of Babylon itself, it is recorded that he paid homage at the temple of the Babylonian god Marduk – thereby gaining the support of the Babylonian people and minimizing further bloodshed. This Babylonian document has been interpreted as referring to the return to their homelands of several displaced cultural groups, one of which could have been the Jews:

From [Babylon] to Aššur and (from) Susa, Agade, Ešnunna, Zamban, Me-Turnu, Der, as far as the region of Gutium, the sacred centers on the other side of the Tigris, whose sanctuaries had been abandoned for a long time, I returned the images of the gods, who had resided there, to their places and I let them dwell in eternal abodes. I gathered all their inhabitants and returned to them their dwellings. In addition, at the command of Marduk, the great lord, I settled in their habitations, in pleasing abodes, the gods of Sumer and Akkad, whom Nabonidus, to the anger of the lord of the gods, had brought into Babylon. (lines 30–33)

However, it has been argued that it must be referring to people associated to the image's cult instead of deportees. Diana Edelman has pointed at the serious chronological difficulties that arise when we accept that the Jews returned during the reign of Cyrus.

The terms used by the author of Deutero-Isaiah are reminiscent of certain passages in the Cyrus Cylinder. Traditionally, these passages in Isaiah were believed to predate the rule of Cyrus by about 100 years; however, most modern scholars date Isaiah 40–55 (often referred to as Deutero-Isaiah) toward the end of the Babylonian exile (c. 536 BC). Whereas Isaiah 1–39 (referred to as Proto-Isaiah) saw the destruction of Israel as imminent, and the restoration in the future, Deutero-Isaiah speaks of the destruction in the past, and the restoration as imminent. According to scholar R. N. Whybray, the author of Deutero-Isaiah (chapters 40–55) was mistaken in thinking that Cyrus would destroy Babylon, while he instead made it more splendid than ever. But he did allow the Jewish exiles to return home, though not in the triumphant manner which Deutero-Isaiah expected.

Then the alliance between Cyrus and God is made explicit:

Among the classical Jewish sources, besides the Bible, Josephus (1st century AD) mentions that Cyrus freed the Jews from captivity and helped rebuild the temple.  He also wrote to the rulers and governors that they should contribute to the rebuilding of the temple and assisted them in rebuilding the temple.  A letter from Cyrus to the Jews is described by Josephus:

Authenticity of the decree

The historical nature of this decree has been challenged. Professor Lester L. Grabbe has argued that there was no decree but that there was a policy that allowed exiles to return to their homelands and rebuild their temples. He also argues that the archaeology suggests that the return was a "trickle" taking place over perhaps decades, resulting in a maximum population of perhaps 30,000.
Mary Joan Winn Leith says that although the decree may be authentic, the cylinder cannot confirm it.  She also notes that "the cylinder never calls for a general release of deportees or a universal restoration of centers of worship that had suffered at Babylonian hands." Cyrus, like earlier rulers, was through these decrees trying to gain support from those who might be strategically important, particularly those close to Egypt which he wished to conquer. She also wrote that "appeals to Marduk in the cylinder and to Yahweh in the biblical decree demonstrate the Persian tendency to co-opt local religious and political traditions in the interest of imperial control."

See also

 Cyrus the Great in the Quran
 Darius the Mede
 Ezra 1

References

Initial text from Easton's Bible Dictionary, 1897 and Schaff-Herzog Encyclopaedia of Religion.

External links

 Chronicle of Nabonidus and other documents in the British Museum.

Ancient Jewish Persian history
Books of Chronicles people
Book of Daniel people
Book of Isaiah people
Cultural depictions of Cyrus the Great
Ezra–Nehemiah
Monarchs of the Hebrew Bible
Religion in ancient Israel and Judah
6th-century BC biblical rulers